Prince Francis may refer to:

Prince Francis Joseph of Battenberg
Prince Francis of Teck
Prince Francis, Count of Trapani
Prince Francis Joseph of Braganza, Portuguese prince
Prince Francis (cricketer) (born 1957), Jamaican cricketer